The Jordanian records in swimming are the fastest ever performances of swimmers from Jordan, which are recognised and ratified by the Jordan Swimming Federation.

All records were set in finals unless noted otherwise.

Long Course (50 m)

Men

Women

Mixed relay

Short Course (25 m)

Men

Women

Mixed relay

References
General
Jordanian records 13 August 2022 updated
Specific

External links
JSF web site

Jordan
records
Swimming
Swimming